The Criminal Justice Act 1967 (c 80) is an Act of the Parliament of the United Kingdom.

Section 9 allows uncontroversial witness statements to be read in court instead of having to call the witness to give live testimony in the courtroom, if it will not be necessary to challenge their evidence in cross-examination. The rule in section 9 was not new in 1967; it was a re-enactment of a law which had previously appeared in the Criminal Justice Act 1925 and the Criminal Justice Act 1948.

Section 13 removed the requirement for unanimous verdicts and permitted majority verdicts for juries in England and Wales. (This section was repealed and replaced by the Juries Act 1974.)

Section 89 makes it an offence to lie in a witness statement (since perjury only applies to lies told in court).

See also
Criminal Justice Act

References
"Criminal Justice Act 1967". Halsbury's Statutes of England and Wales. Fourth Edition. LexisNexis. 2010 Reissue. Volume 11(1). Page 429. 2008 Reissue. Volume 12(1). Page 451.
John Burke (ed). "Criminal Justice Act 1967". Current Law Statutes Annotated 1967. Sweet & Maxwell. Stevens & Sons. London. W Green & Son. Edinburgh. 1967. Chapter 80. Google Books.
Brian Harris. "A Short Guide to the Criminal Justice Act 1967." Justice of the Peace Ltd. 1968. Reviewed at 41 Police Journal 128.

External links
The Criminal Justice Act 1967, as amended from the National Archives.
The Criminal Justice Act 1967, as originally enacted from the National Archives.

United Kingdom Acts of Parliament 1967
Criminal law of the United Kingdom